Tolrestat (INN) (AY-27773) is an aldose reductase inhibitor which was approved for the control of certain diabetic complications.

While it was approved for marketed in several countries, it failed a Phase III trial in the U.S. due to toxicity and never received FDA approval.  It was discontinued by Wyeth in 1997 because of the risk of severe liver toxicity and death. It was sold under the tradename Alredase.

References

Aldose reductase inhibitors
Acetic acids
Hepatotoxins
Naphthol ethers
Trifluoromethyl compounds
Thioamides
Withdrawn drugs